"In Another World" is a song written by Tom Shapiro, Wally Wilson and Jimmy Yeary, and recorded by American country music singer Joe Diffie.  It was released in July 2001 as the first single and title track from his album In Another World.  The song became Diffie's twenty-sixth Top 40 country hit, as well as his seventeenth and last Top Ten hit as of 2016.

Critical reception
William Ruhlmann of Allmusic, in his review of In Another World, said that the song was not one of the better tracks on the album. He called it "a wistful reflection on lost love, but a bit sketchy". Country Weekly critic Mark Marymont gave a more favorable review, saying that it was "a shimmering ballad perfect for his expressive tenor".

Chart performance
"In Another World" debuted at number 60 on the U.S. Billboard Hot Country Singles & Tracks for the week of July 28, 2001. The song charted on the Billboard Hot Country Singles & Tracks chart for thirty-four weeks, peaking at number 10 on the chart week of February 23, 2002. It also peaked at number 66 on the Billboard Hot 100.

Year-end charts

References

2001 singles
2001 songs
Joe Diffie songs
Songs written by Tom Shapiro
Song recordings produced by Don Cook
Songs written by Jimmy Yeary
Monument Records singles
Songs written by Wally Wilson